"Will You Still Love Me?" is a song recorded by the American rock band Chicago for their fifteenth studio album Chicago 18 (1986). The song was written by David Foster, Tom Keane and Richard Baskin, and produced by Foster. 

The second single released from the Chicago 18 album, it reached number three on the US Billboard Hot 100 in early 1987, and also at number two on the Billboard Adult Contemporary chart.

Background
The song was Chicago's first top-ten hit following the departure of Peter Cetera, and it featured new singer and bassist Jason Scheff on lead vocals. One of the song's co-writers, Tom Keane had previously fronted the early 1980s band Keane, for which Jason Scheff played bass.

Personnel 

 Jason Scheff – bass guitar, lead and backing vocals
 Bill Champlin – keyboards, co-lead vocals, backing vocals
 Robert Lamm – keyboards, backing vocals
 Lee Loughnane – trumpet
 James Pankow – trombone, brass arrangements
 Walter Parazaider – woodwinds
 Danny Seraphine – drums, drum programming
 Vocal arrangements by Chicago, Bill Champlin, and David Foster

Additional musicians 

 David Foster – additional arrangements
 Tom Keane – keyboards, backing vocals
 Michael Boddicker, David Boruff, Rhett Lawrence, Bo Tomlyn – synthesizer programming
 Michael Landau, Howard "Buzz" Feiten, Steve Lukather – guitars
 Jeremy Lubbock – string arrangements

Charts

Weekly charts

Year-end charts

Cover versions
In 2003, jazz group Urban Knights, led by pianist Ramsey Lewis, covered the song with vocals by Michelle Williams from Destiny's Child-fame.

References 

1986 songs
1986 singles
Chicago (band) songs
Songs written by David Foster
Rock ballads
1980s ballads
Song recordings produced by David Foster
Songs written by Richard Baskin
Songs written by Tom Keane (musician)
Full Moon Records singles
Warner Records singles